Tampoi is a suburb in Johor Bahru, Johor, Malaysia. It predominantly consists of light industry factories.

Geography

Religion
 Tampoi Holy Word Church（丹杯圣道堂）
 Tampoi Guan Di Miao Temple (新山淡杯关帝庙)
 Tampoi Kuan Ti Kong (新山淡杯第一花园关圣坛)
 Tampoi Poh Noi Keng (淡杯宝莲宫)
 Tampoi Tian Hou Gong (淡杯天后宫)
 Tampoi Kuan Yin Temple (茉莉花花园观音亭)
 Sri Subramaniam Temple
 Sri Muniswaran Temple
 Masjid Jamek Ungku Puan Aminah
 Masjid An-nur
 Masjid Jamek Ar-rahman
 Masjid Jamek As-solihin
 Surau An-nur

Shopping

 Angsana Johor Bahru Mall
 KiPMall Tampoi
 Giant Hypermarket Tampoi
 Pusat Perniagaan Taman Dahlia
 Paradigm Mall

Education
 SJK (C) Tampoi 
 SMK Sri Rahmat
 SK Tmn Tampoi Utama
 SK Seri Kenanga
 SK Seri Melati
 SK Bandar Baru Uda 1
 SK Bandar Baru Uda 11
 SMK Bandar Baru Uda
 SMK Dato' Abdul Rahman Yassin
 SK Taman Cempaka

Transportation
The area is accessible by Muafakat Bus route P-203. or Causeway Link (1B, 5B, 51B) from Johor Bahru Sentral railway station.

References

Johor Bahru
Towns and suburbs in Johor Bahru District
Populated places in Johor